Salitpa is an unincorporated community in Clarke County, Alabama.  It has also been known as River Hill.

History
A post office called Salitpa has been in operation since 1855. The community took its name from nearby Satilpa Creek. An error in writing the name (crossing the L instead of the T) when applying for a post office resulted in the name being changed.

Notable person
Salitpa was the home of Ray Prim, a minor league baseball star in the Pacific Coast League with the Los Angeles Angels from 1936 to 1942, again in 1944 and in 1947.

See also
 List of geographic names derived from anagrams and ananyms

References

Unincorporated communities in Alabama
Geography of Clarke County, Alabama